Călan is a town in Hunedoara County, Romania. Twelve villages are administered by the town: Batiz (Batiz), Călanu Mic (Kiskalán), Grid, Nădăștia de Jos (Alsónádasd), Nădăștia de Sus (Felsőnádasd), Ohaba Streiului (Sztrigyohába), Sâncrai (Szentkirály), Sântămăria de Piatră (Kőboldogfalva), Strei (Zeikdorf; Zeykfalva), Strei-Săcel (Sztrigyszacsal), Streisângeorgiu (Sztrigyszentgyörgy) and Valea Sângeorgiului (Szentgyörgyválya).

Geography
The town is located in the central part of the county, in the historical Țara Hațegului region. It lies in the Strei River valley, at  altitude. 

The Călan railway station serves the CFR rail line connecting Simeria to Petroșani.

Population

According to the census from 2011 there was a total population of 11,279  people living in this town.
Sorted by nationality (respondents for whom data was available):
9,716 Romanians (92.17%)
525 Hungarians (4.98%)
161 Romani (1.52%)
99 Germans (0.93%)
Sorted by religion:
10,788 Orthodox
1,199 Roman Catholic
399 Greek Catholic
200 Reformed

History
 There was a village in Dacia known as Aquae. Archaeological evidence shows that the place was inhabited for a long time.
 1387 - First mentioned in a document.
 1961 - Călan became a town.

Ponts of interest include the Călan steel works, the Strei Church and the Streisângeorgiu Church.

Natives
 Gheorghe Barbu (born 1951), Romanian politician
 István Szőts (1912–1998), Hungarian movie director
 , (1887-1940), Hungarian sculptor
  (born 1968), Romanian politician
  (born 1938), Romanian doctor, honorary member of the Romanian Academy 
  (1906–1962), Romanian politician

References

 
Towns in Romania
Populated places in Hunedoara County
Localities in Transylvania
Monotowns in Romania